Michael K. Kennedy (born October 30, 1939) was an American politician in the state of Iowa.

Kennedy was born in New Hampton, Iowa. He was a lawyer. He served in the Iowa House of Representatives from 1969 to 1973 as a Democrat.

References

1939 births
Living people
People from New Hampton, Iowa
Iowa lawyers
Democratic Party members of the Iowa House of Representatives